Roblinella is a genus of small air-breathing land snails, terrestrial pulmonate gastropod mollusks in the family Charopidae.

Species
Species within the genus Roblinella include:
 Roblinella agnewi

References

 Abstract of a paper on a species in the genus

 
Charopidae
Taxonomy articles created by Polbot